The 2011–12 Oman Elite League (known as the Omantel Elite League for sponsorship reasons) was the 36th edition of the top football league in Oman. It began on 25 September 2011 and was scheduled to finish on 19 May 2012, but for the first time in the history of Omani League, the league title had to be decided by a playoff. Al-Suwaiq Club were the defending champions, having won the previous 2010–11 Elite League season. On Monday, 21 May 2012, Fanja SC won the Championship Final match against Al-Shabab Club 7–6 on penalties after the match had ended 3–3 after extra time and emerged as the champions of the 2011–12 Oman Elite League.

Teams
This season the league had 12 teams. Saham SC and Al-Nasr S.C.S.C. were relegated to the Second Division League after finishing in the relegation zone in the 2010–11 season. Muscat Club were also relegated after losing the relegation/promotion playoff against Fanja SC. The winner qualified for 2013 AFC Cup. The three relegated teams were replaced by Second Division League winners Fanja SC (Group A) and Sur SC (Group B) and runners-up Al-Musannah SC (Group B).

Stadia and locations

League table

Results

Championship play-off

Promotion/relegation play-off

1st leg

2nd leg

Al Seeb secured promotion after winning 4:3 on aggregate
In the 2012–13 season the league had increased from 12 to 14 teams. As a result, despite losing the relegation play-off to Al-Seeb Club, Al-Hilal SC retained their place in the top division and Al-Musannah SC, whose 11th-place finish would have seen them relegated also retained their place in the top division.

Season statistics

Top scorers

Media coverage

See also
2011 Sultan Qaboos Cup
2011–12 Oman First Division League

References

Top level Omani football league seasons
1
Oman